Taciturn or Taciturnity may refer to:

 HMS Taciturn (P334), a British submarine of the third group of the T class
 Silence
 Abandonment (legal) (known as taciturnity in Scots law), failure to assert a legal right in a way that implies abandonment of the right
 William the Silent (also known as William the Taciturn), leader of the Dutch revolt against the Spanish Habsburgs that set off the Eighty Years' War